Kicker (also referred to as KDE Panel) is the main panel used in KDE 3 and earlier, and also in the TDE desktop. Together with KDesktop, it forms the graphical shell. It can be customized by the user. By default, it has the K Menu, a Desktop Access button, a Home button, a Konqueror button, a Kontact button, and a Help button. It also has the Desktop Preview & Pager, the Taskbar, the System Tray, and the Clock.

It was a core part of the KDE desktop, and as such, packaged as part of the kdebase module. Kicker was also ported from Qt3 to Qt4.

In KDE Software Compilation 4, Kicker, KDesktop, and SuperKaramba were replaced by KDE Plasma 4. The graphical shells KDE Plasma 4 and KDE Plasma 5 being widget engines of their own, SuperKaramba is no longer necessary and e.g. "Kicker" was re-implemented as such a desktop widget.
Kicker is currently developed by the TDE developers for the Trinity Desktop Environment.

Kicker can be launched separately in other windowing environments that lack a panel of their own, such as twm, and in case the twm menu lacks some of the commands that Kicker may have. This can be done by editing a .twmrc file, or from a terminal emulator:

 $ kicker &

Applets

Kicker can embed various applets into itself. The included applets as of KDE 3.5 are:
 Binary Clock
 Bookmarks Menu
 Character Selector
 Clock
 Color Picker
 Desktop Preview & Pager
 Dictionary
 Eyes
 Fifteen Pieces
 Find
 K Menu
 Keyboard Status Applet
 Klipper
 Konqueror Profiles
 Lock/Logout Buttons
 Math Expression Evaluator
 Media Control
 Moon Phase
 Network Folders
 News Ticker
 Non-KDE Application Launcher
 Print System
 Public File Server
 Quick File Browser
 Quick Launcher
 Recent Documents
 Run Command
 Runaway Process Catcher
 Settings
 Show Desktop
 Sound Mixer
 Storage Media
 System Guard
 System Menu
 System Monitor
 Taskbar
 Terminal Sessions
 Trash
 Weather Report
 Window List Menu
 Wireless Network Information
 World Wide Watch
 aRts Control

See also

 Linux on the desktop
 Taskbar
 Docky
 GNOME Panel

References 

Application launchers
KDE software